Aylsham South railway station served the town of Aylsham in Norfolk from 1880 to 1981. The period station buildings were subsequently demolished in 1989 to allow for the construction of Aylsham railway station, the northern terminus of the Bure Valley Railway, a narrow gauge operation which reuses some of the trackbed of the old railway line.

History

Opened by the East Norfolk Railway, then run by the Great Eastern Railway, it became part of the London and North Eastern Railway during the Grouping of 1923. The station then passed on to the Eastern Region of British Railways  on nationalisation in 1948.

In 1952 the passenger service stopped, but the freight service continued until 1977. In 1990, the station buildings - then one of the most complete remaining Great Eastern stations in Norfolk, were obliterated to make way for the Bure Valley Railway whose headquarters now occupy the site.

References

External sources
Station on navigable O.S. map
Bure Valley Railway website
Friends of the Bure Valley Railway website

Disused railway stations in Norfolk
Former Great Eastern Railway stations
Railway stations in Great Britain opened in 1880
Railway stations in Great Britain closed in 1952
Aylsham